The 1979 Toronto Blue Jays season was the franchise's third season of Major League Baseball. It resulted in the Blue Jays finishing seventh in the American League East with a record of 53 wins and 109 losses. The Blue Jays were the only American League East team to finish 1979 with a losing record and the loss total of 109 set the franchise mark; it is also the last time as of 2021 the team lost over 100 games in a season. Attendance for the season decreased to 1,431,651.

Offseason
 January 9, 1979: Mark Eichhorn was drafted by the Toronto Blue Jays in the 2nd round of the 1979 amateur draft (January). 
 January 11, 1979: Rico Carty was signed as a free agent by the Blue Jays.
 March 17, 1979: Steve Luebber was signed as a free agent by the Blue Jays.
 March 25, 1979: Bobby Brown was selected off waivers by the Blue Jays from the New York Mets.

Regular season
Following the team's poor performance, manager Roy Hartsfield was fired at the end of the season. One highlight of the season was the awarding of the American League Rookie of the Year Award to Alfredo Griffin.

The end of the 1979 season marked a crossroads for the franchise. The first real talent from the minor leagues had made it to the major league roster. Such talent included pitcher Dave Stieb and third baseman Danny Ainge.

Season standings

Record vs. opponents

Opening Day starters
 Bob Bailor
 Rick Bosetti
 Rico Carty
 Rick Cerone
 Jim Clancy
 Alfredo Griffin
 Roy Howell
 John Mayberry
 Dave McKay
 Alvis Woods

Notable transactions
 April 19, 1979: Bobby Brown was purchased from the Blue Jays by the New York Yankees.
 April 24, 1979: Tony Fernández was signed as an amateur free agent by the Blue Jays.
 July 25, 1979: Craig Kusick was purchased by the Blue Jays from the Minnesota Twins.

Draft picks
 June 5, 1979: 1979 Major League Baseball draft
Future NFL quarterback Jay Schroeder was drafted by the Toronto Blue Jays in the 1st round, but did not sign.
Ron Shepherd was drafted by the Blue Jays in the 2nd round.
Ron Romanick was drafted by the Blue Jays in the 3rd round, but did not sign.
Andre Robertson was drafted by the Blue Jays in the 4th round.

Roster

Game log

|- align="center" bgcolor="ffbbbb"
|  1 || April 5 ||  @ Royals || 11–2 || Leonard (1–0) || Underwood (0–1) || Mingori (1) || 37,754 || 0–1
|- align="center" bgcolor="ffbbbb"
|  2 || April 7 ||  @ Royals || 7–4 || Gura (1–0) || Clancy (0–1) || Hrabosky (1) || 21,850 || 0–2
|- align="center" bgcolor="ffbbbb"
|  3 || April 8 ||  @ Royals || 8–3 || Splittorff (1–0) || Lemongello (0–1) || || 23,477 || 0–3
|- align="center" bgcolor="bbffbb"
|  4 || April 10 ||  @ White Sox || 10–2 || Huffman (1–0) || Kravec (0–2) || Freisleben (1) || 41,043 || 1–3
|- align="center" bgcolor="bbbbbb"
| – || April 11 || @ White Sox || colspan=6|Postponed (rain) Rescheduled for April 12
|- align="center" bgcolor="bbffbb"
|  5 || April 12 ||  @ White Sox || 9–7 || Murphy (1–0) || LaGrow (0–1) || || 1,205 || 2–3
|- align="center" bgcolor="bbffbb"
|  6 || April 13 ||  Royals || 4–1 (6)  || Clancy (1–1) || Splittorff (1–1) || || 40,035 || 3–3
|- align="center" bgcolor="bbffbb"
|  7 || April 14 ||  Royals || 8–6 || Freisleben (1–0) || Leonard (1–1) || || 11,683 || 4–3
|- align="center" bgcolor="ffbbbb"
|  8 || April 15 ||  Royals || 12–10 || Rodríguez (2–0) || Murphy (1–1) || Hrabosky (2) || 12,287 || 4–4
|- align="center" bgcolor="ffbbbb"
|  9 || April 16 ||  White Sox || 8–4 || Scarbery (1–0) || Murphy (1–2) || Proly (1) || 11,211 || 4–5
|- align="center" bgcolor="ffbbbb"
| 10 || April 17 ||  White Sox || 6–1 || Barrios (1–0) || Underwood (0–2) || Proly (2) || 10,074 || 4–6
|- align="center" bgcolor="ffbbbb"
| 11 || April 18 ||  White Sox || 12–5 || Wortham (3–0) || Clancy (1–2) || || 10,478 || 4–7
|- align="center" bgcolor="ffbbbb"
| 12 || April 20 ||  @ Tigers || 7–2 || Wilcox (2–0) || Lemongello (0–2) || || 13,617 || 4–8
|- align="center" bgcolor="bbffbb"
| 13 || April 21 ||  @ Tigers || 5–4 || Huffman (2–0) || Billingham (1–1) || Freisleben (2) || 10,904 || 5–8
|- align="center" bgcolor="ffbbbb"
| 14 || April 22 ||  @ Tigers || 4–1 || Rozema (1–1) || Underwood (0–3) || || 14,543 || 5–9
|- align="center" bgcolor="ffbbbb"
| 15 || April 23 ||  @ Rangers || 5–0 || Alexander (1–0) || Clancy (1–3) || Kern (2) || 12,661 || 5–10
|- align="center" bgcolor="bbffbb"
| 16 || April 24 ||  @ Rangers || 2–0 || Lemanczyk (1–0) || Comer (1–2) || || 14,411 || 6–10
|- align="center" bgcolor="ffbbbb"
| 17 || April 25 ||  @ Rangers || 4–3 (10)  || Lyle (2–1) || Jefferson (0–1) || || 15,731 || 6–11
|- align="center" bgcolor="ffbbbb"
| 18 || April 27 ||  Brewers || 8–5 || Sorensen (3–2) || Huffman (2–1) || McClure (1) || 10,306 || 6–12
|- align="center" bgcolor="ffbbbb"
| 19 || April 28 ||  Brewers || 11–8 (10)  || McClure (3–0) || Willis (0–1) || || 12,683  || 6–13
|- align="center" bgcolor="ffbbbb"
| 20 || April 29 ||  Brewers || 3–0 || Caldwell (4–1) || Clancy (1–4) || || || 6–14
|- align="center" bgcolor="bbffbb"
| 21 || April 29 ||  Brewers || 5–3 || Lemanczyk (2–0) || Travers (0–2) || || 16,083 || 7–14
|- align="center" bgcolor="ffbbbb"
| 22 || April 30 ||  Twins || 6–3 || Hartzell (1–0) || Lemongello (0–3) || || 10,170 || 7–15
|-

|- align="center" bgcolor="ffbbbb"
| 23 || May 1 ||  Twins || 3–2 || Koosman (5–0) || Jefferson (0–2) || Marshall (8) || 10,155 || 7–16
|- align="center" bgcolor="ffbbbb"
| 24 || May 2 ||  Twins || 7–5 || Goltz (3–3) || Huffman (2–2) || Marshall (9) || 20,110 || 7–17
|- align="center" bgcolor="ffbbbb"
| 25 || May 3 ||  @ Brewers || 5–4 || Travers (1–2) || Underwood (0–4) || || 7,801 || 7–18
|- align="center" bgcolor="bbffbb"
| 26 || May 4 ||  @ Brewers || 5–4 || Clancy (2–4) || Caldwell (4–2) || Freisleben (3) || 28,896 || 8–18
|- align="center" bgcolor="ffbbbb"
| 27 || May 5 ||  @ Brewers || 6–1 || Slaton (3–1) || Lemanczyk (2–1) || || 14,910 || 8–19
|- align="center" bgcolor="ffbbbb"
| 28 || May 6 ||  @ Brewers || 4–0 || Sorensen (4–3) || Lemongello (0–4) || || 53,962 || 8–20
|- align="center" bgcolor="ffbbbb"
| 29 || May 7 ||  @ Twins || 6–1 || Goltz (4–3) || Huffman (2–3) || || 4,571 || 8–21
|- align="center" bgcolor="ffbbbb"
| 30 || May 8 ||  @ Twins || 16–6 || Bacsik (1–0) || Willis (0–2) || || 3,126 || 8–22
|- align="center" bgcolor="bbbbbb"
| – || May 9 || @ Twins || colspan=6|Postponed (rain) Rescheduled for July 21
|- align="center" bgcolor="ffbbbb"
| 31 || May 11 ||  Rangers || 3–1 || Matlack (1–2) || Clancy (2–5) || || 12,153 || 8–23
|- align="center" bgcolor="ffbbbb"
| 32 || May 12 ||  Rangers || 3–1 || Comer (3–3) || Lemanczyk (2–2) || Lyle (5) || 14,109 || 8–24
|- align="center" bgcolor="bbffbb"
| 33 || May 13 ||  Rangers || 3–1 || Lemongello (1–4) || Alexander (1–2) || || || 9–24
|- align="center" bgcolor="ffbbbb"
| 34 || May 13 ||  Rangers || 7–5 || Farmer (2–0) || Huffman (2–4) || Lyle (6) || 16,531 || 9–25
|- align="center" bgcolor="ffbbbb"
| 35 || May 14 ||  @ Indians || 1–0 || Waits (4–3) || Underwood (0–5) || || 3,867 || 9–26
|- align="center" bgcolor="ffbbbb"
| 36 || May 15 ||  @ Indians || 5–3 || Monge (2–3) || Garvin (0–1) || || 3,978 || 9–27
|- align="center" bgcolor="bbffbb"
| 37 || May 16 ||  @ Indians || 4–3 || Lemanczyk (3–2) || Wise (3–4) || || 4,079 || 10–27
|- align="center" bgcolor="ffbbbb"
| 38 || May 17 ||  @ Indians || 8–3 || Paxton (3–2) || Lemongello (1–5) || || 4,409 || 10–28
|- align="center" bgcolor="ffbbbb"
| 39 || May 18 ||  Orioles || 7–6 (11) || Stanhouse (3–1) || Freisleben (1–1)  || || 12,088 || 10–29
|- align="center" bgcolor="ffbbbb"
| 40 || May 19 ||  Orioles || 4–3 || Palmer (5–2) || Underwood (0–6) || Stanhouse (4) || 18,144 || 10–30
|- align="center" bgcolor="ffbbbb"
| 41 || May 20 ||  Orioles || 6–2 || Martínez (6–2) || Jefferson (0–3) || || 30,065 || 10–31
|- align="center" bgcolor="bbffbb"
| 42 || May 21 ||  Indians || 8–1 || Lemanczyk (4–2) || Wise (3–5) || || 12,260 || 11–31
|- align="center" bgcolor="ffbbbb"
| 43 || May 22 ||  Indians || 8–6 || Wilkins (2–2) || Lemongello (1–6) || Monge (5) || 10,182 || 11–32
|- align="center" bgcolor="ffbbbb"
| 44 || May 23 ||  Indians || 4–3 || Garland (2–4) || Freisleben (1–2) || || 20,283 || 11–33
|- align="center" bgcolor="bbbbbb"
| – || May 25 || Red Sox || colspan=6|Postponed (rain) Rescheduled for September 17
|- align="center" bgcolor="bbffbb"
| 45 || May 26 ||  Red Sox || 7–6 || Buskey (1–0) || Campbell (2–2) || || 31,590 || 12–33
|- align="center" bgcolor="ffbbbb"
| 46 || May 27 ||  Red Sox || 1–0 || Rainey (3–2) || Jefferson (0–4) || || 33,556 || 12–34
|- align="center" bgcolor="ffbbbb"
| 47 || May 28 ||  Tigers || 6–2 || Morris (2–1) || Lemanczyk (4–3) || || 10,740 || 12–35
|- align="center" bgcolor="ffbbbb"
| 48 || May 29 ||  Tigers || 9–8 || Tobik (1–0) || Buskey (1–1) || Hiller (3) || 11,449 || 12–36
|- align="center" bgcolor="ffbbbb"
| 49 || May 30 ||  Tigers || 8–2 || Wilcox (4–2) || Huffman (2–5) || || 21,359 || 12–37
|- align="center" bgcolor="ffbbbb"
| 50 || May 31 ||  Tigers || 1–0 || Underwood (1–0) || Underwood (0–7) || Hiller (4) || 12,423 || 12–38
|-

|- align="center" bgcolor="ffbbbb"
| 51 || June 1 ||  @ Mariners || 7–2 || Mitchell (1–4) || Jefferson (0–5) || || 4,113 || 12–39
|- align="center" bgcolor="bbffbb"
| 52 || June 2 ||  @ Mariners || 6–2 || Lemanczyk (5–3) || Jones (0–6) || || 8,011 || 13–39
|- align="center" bgcolor="ffbbbb"
| 53 || June 3 ||  @ Mariners || 10–5 || Parrott (3–1) || Lemongello (1–7) || || 4,436 || 13–40
|- align="center" bgcolor="ffbbbb"
| 54 || June 4 ||  @ Angels || 4–2 || Barlow (1–1) || Huffman (2–6) || Clear (5) || 16,979 || 13–41
|- align="center" bgcolor="ffbbbb"
| 55 || June 5 ||  @ Angels || 3–0 || Tanana (5–3) || Underwood (0–8) || || 18,862 || 13–42
|- align="center" bgcolor="bbffbb"
| 56 || June 6 ||  @ Angels || 5–4 || Jefferson (1–5) || LaRoche (2–5) || || 18,835 || 14–42
|- align="center" bgcolor="bbffbb"
| 57 || June 8 ||  @ Athletics || 2–1 || Buskey (2–1) || Heaverlo (2–6) || || 2,022 || 15–42
|- align="center" bgcolor="bbffbb"
| 58 || June 9 ||  @ Athletics || 5–0 || Huffman (3–6) || Keough (0–8) || || 1,725 || 16–42
|- align="center" bgcolor="ffbbbb"
| 59 || June 10 ||  @ Athletics || 12–1 || Hamilton (2–0) || Underwood (0–9) || || 2,400 || 16–43
|- align="center" bgcolor="bbffbb"
| 60 || June 11 ||  Mariners || 2–0 || Lemanczyk (6–3) || Bannister (3–6) || || 10,213 || 17–43
|- align="center" bgcolor="ffbbbb"
| 61 || June 12 ||  Mariners || 5–1 || Abbott (3–7) || Jefferson (1–6) || || 12,056 || 17–44
|- align="center" bgcolor="bbffbb"
| 62 || June 13 ||  Angels || 9–8 || Freisleben (2–2) || LaRoche (2–6) || || || 18–44
|- align="center" bgcolor="ffbbbb"
| 63 || June 13 ||  Angels || 10–2 || Aase (6–4) || Willis (0–3) || || 28,577 || 18–45
|- align="center" bgcolor="ffbbbb"
| 64 || June 14 ||  Angels || 10–2 || Ryan (8–3) || Huffman (3–7) || || 15,097 || 18–46
|- align="center" bgcolor="bbffbb"
| 65 || June 15 ||  Athletics || 6–0 || Underwood  (1–9) || Hamilton (2–1) || || 13,124 || 19–46
|- align="center" bgcolor="bbffbb"
| 66 || June 16 ||  Athletics || 3–2 || Lemanczyk (7–3) || McCatty (4–2) || || 19,270 || 20–46
|- align="center" bgcolor="bbffbb"
| 67 || June 17 ||  Athletics || 10–9 || Buskey (3–1) || Heaverlo (2–7) || || 25,518 || 21–46
|- align="center" bgcolor="bbffbb"
| 68 || June 19 ||  @ Yankees || 5–4 || Huffman (4–7) || John (10–3) || Buskey (1) || 36,211 || 22–46
|- align="center" bgcolor="ffbbbb"
| 69 || June 20 ||  @ Yankees || 2–1 || Hood (2–0) || Underwood (1–10) || Davis (1) || || 22–47
|- align="center" bgcolor="bbffbb"
| 70 || June 20 ||  @ Yankees || 3–2 || Moore (1–0) || Burris (1–3) || || 32,129 || 23–47
|- align="center" bgcolor="ffbbbb"
| 71 || June 21 ||  @ Yankees || 3–1 || Tiant (3–2) || Lemanczyk (7–4) || Davis (2) || 19,278 || 23–48
|- align="center" bgcolor="ffbbbb"
| 72 || June 22 ||  @ Red Sox || 12–1 || Rainey (5–4) || Jefferson (1–7) || Burgeier (2) || 31,089 || 23–49
|- align="center" bgcolor="ffbbbb"
| 73 || June 23 ||  @ Red Sox || 4–3 (11) || Drago (6–3) || Buskey (3–2) || || 34,130 || 23–50
|- align="center" bgcolor="ffbbbb"
| 74 || June 24 ||  @ Red Sox || 8–4 || Torrez (8–4) || Huffman (4–8) || || 33,560 || 23–51
|- align="center" bgcolor="bbffbb"
| 75 || June 25 ||  Yankees || 3–1 || Underwood (2–10) || Clay (1–3) || || 37,612 || 24–51
|- align="center" bgcolor="ffbbbb"
| 76 || June 26 ||  Yankees || 11–2 || Tiant (4–2) || Lemanczyk (7–5) || || 38,696 || 24–52
|- align="center" bgcolor="ffbbbb"
| 77 || June 28 ||  Yankees || 5–3 (10) || Davis (6–0) || Lemongello (1–8) || || 39,347 || 24–53
|- align="center" bgcolor="ffbbbb"
| 78 || June 29 ||  @ Orioles || 6–1 || McGregor (2–2) || Stieb (0–1) || || || 24–54
|- align="center" bgcolor="ffbbbb"
| 79 || June 29 ||  @ Orioles || 4–0 || Stone (6–5) || Huffman (4–9) || Stanhouse (9) || 20,872 || 24–55
|- align="center" bgcolor="ffbbbb"
| 80 || June 30 ||  @ Orioles || 2–0 || Flanagan (10–5) || Underwood (2–11) || || 19,807 || 24–56
|-

|- align="center" bgcolor="ffbbbb"
| 81 || July 1 ||  @ Orioles || 10–7 || Stewart (5–2) || Jefferson (1–8) || Stanhouse (10) || 33,592 || 24–57
|- align="center" bgcolor="bbffbb"
| 82 || July 3 ||  @ Tigers || 9–1 || Moore (2–0) || Billingham (7–5) || || 20,885 || 25–57
|- align="center" bgcolor="bbffbb"
| 83 || July 4 ||  @ Tigers || 7–6 (11) || Buskey (4–2) || Tobik (1–4) || || 13,772 || 26–57
|- align="center" bgcolor="ffbbbb"
| 84 || July 5 ||  @ Tigers || 3–2 || Young (2–1) || Huffman (4–10) || López (2) || 13,199 || 26–58
|- align="center" bgcolor="bbffbb"
| 85 || July 6 ||  @ Rangers || 5–1 || Underwood (3–11) || Johnson (4–9) || Buskey (2) || 19,539 || 27–58
|- align="center" bgcolor="ffbbbb"
| 86 || July 7 ||  @ Rangers || 2–0 || Medich (2–3) || Lemanczyk (7–6) || Kern (15) || 23,935 || 27–59
|- align="center" bgcolor="ffbbbb"
| 87 || July 8 ||  @ Rangers || 4–3 || Comer (9–6) || Moore (2–1) || Lyle (9) || 17,489 || 27–60
|- align="center" bgcolor="bbffbb"
| 88 || July 9 ||  Brewers || 7–1 || Stieb (1–1) || Sorensen (10–9) || || 14,240 || 28–60
|- align="center" bgcolor="ffbbbb"
| 89 || July 11 ||  Brewers || 2–1 (10) || Slaton (9–4) || Buskey (4–3) || || 22,523 || 28–61
|- align="center" bgcolor="ffbbbb"
| 90 || July 12 ||  Brewers || 5–3 || Haas (6–6) || Underwood (3–12) || Galasso (1) || 14,207 || 28–62
|- align="center" bgcolor="ffbbbb"
| 91 || July 13 ||  Twins || 6–4 || Goltz (8–6) || Lemanczyk (7–7) || Marshall (18) || 14,095 || 28–63
|- align="center" bgcolor="bbffbb"
| 92 || July 14 ||  Twins || 4–2 || Stieb (2–1) || Koosman (11–7) || || 19,187 || 29–63
|- align="center" bgcolor="ffbbbb"
| 93 || July 15 ||  Twins || 9–4 || Zahn (8–2) || Clancy (2–6) || || 19,069 || 29–64
|- align="center" bgcolor="ffbbbb"
| 94 || July 19 ||  @ Brewers || 3–2 (11) || Castro (3–0) || Buskey (4–4) || || 21,152 || 29–65
|- align="center" bgcolor="ffbbbb"
| 95 || July 20 ||  @ Brewers || 2–0 || Slaton (10–4) || Underwood (3–13) || || 27,010 || 29–66
|- align="center" bgcolor="ffbbbb"
| 96 || July 21 ||  @ Twins || 6–4 || Goltz (9–6) || Huffman (4–11) || Marshall (19) || || 29–67
|- align="center" bgcolor="ffbbbb"
| 97 || July 21 ||  @ Twins || 4–3 || Hartzell (5–6) || Moore (2–2) || || 12,887 || 29–68
|- align="center" bgcolor="ffbbbb"
| 98 || July 22 ||  @ Twins || 13–1 || Redfern (5–0) || Lemanczyk (7–8) || || 18,927 || 29–69
|- align="center" bgcolor="ffbbbb"
| 99 || July 23 ||  @ Twins || 7–6 || Marshall (10–9) || Lemongello (1–9) || || 7,482 || 29–70
|- align="center" bgcolor="bbffbb"
|100 || July 25 ||  Rangers || 8–3 || Stieb (3–1) || Johnson (4–12) || Buskey (3) || 24,705 || 30–70
|- align="center" bgcolor="bbffbb"
|101 || July 26 ||  Rangers || 8–4 || Underwood (4–13) || Medich (4–4) || || 14,605 || 31–70
|- align="center" bgcolor="ffbbbb"
|102 || July 27 ||  Tigers || 4–3 (11) || López (5–2) || Buskey (4–5) || || 23,814 || 31–71
|- align="center" bgcolor="bbffbb"
|103 || July 28 ||  Tigers || 3–0 || Lemanczyk (8–8) || Robbins (0–1) || || 30,131 || 32–71
|- align="center" bgcolor="ffbbbb"
|104 || July 29 ||  Tigers || 5–4 || Underwood (6–1) || Clancy (2–7) || López (8) || 33,824 || 32–72
|- align="center" bgcolor="ffbbbb"
|105 || July 30 ||  @ Royals || 9–0 || Gura (7–7) || Stieb (3–2) || || 31,572 || 32–73
|- align="center" bgcolor="ffbbbb"
|106 || July 31 ||  @ Royals || 6–5 || Pattin (4–2) || Jefferson (1–9) || Hrabosky (9) || 22,156 || 32–74
|-

|- align="center" bgcolor="ffbbbb"
|107 || August 1 ||  @ Royals || 4–3 || Gale (9–8) || Huffman (4–12) || Hrabosky (10) || 24,077 || 32–75
|- align="center" bgcolor="ffbbbb"
|108 || August 3 ||  White Sox || 8–5 || Trout (6–4) || Moore (2–3) || Farmer (5) || 14,232 || 32–76
|- align="center" bgcolor="bbffbb"
|109 || August 4 ||  White Sox || 5–2 || Buskey (5–5) || Wortham (11–11) || || 15,130 || 33–76
|- align="center" bgcolor="ffbbbb"
|110 || August 5 ||  White Sox || 5–4 || Kravec (10–10) || Lemanczyk (8–9) || Farmer (6) || 21,203 || 33–77
|- align="center" bgcolor="ffbbbb"
|111 || August 6 ||  Royals || 16–12 || Mingori (3–2) || Stieb (3–3) || || 15,108 || 33–78
|- align="center" bgcolor="bbffbb"
|112 || August 7 ||  Royals || 3–2 || Underwood (5–13) || Splittorff (10–12) || || 23,779 || 34–78
|- align="center" bgcolor="ffbbbb"
|113 || August 9 ||  Royals || 10–3 || Gura (8–8) || Huffman (4–13) || || 20,102 || 34–79
|- align="center" bgcolor="bbbbbb"
| – || August 10 || @ White Sox || colspan=6|Postponed (rain) Rescheduled for August 11
|- align="center" bgcolor="ffbbbb"
|114 || August 11 ||  @ White Sox || 6–1 || Kravec (11–10) || Todd (0–1) || Farmer (8) || || 34–80
|- align="center" bgcolor="bbffbb"
|115 || August 11 ||  @ White Sox || 6–0 || Stieb (4–3) || Scarbery (2–7) || || 19,420 || 35–80
|- align="center" bgcolor="ffbbbb"
|116 || August 12 ||  @ White Sox || 7–0 || Baumgarten (10–7) || Underwood (5–14) || || || 35–81
|- align="center" bgcolor="bbffbb"
|117 || August 12 ||  @ White Sox || 7–5 || Moore (3–3) || Proly (1–4) || Buskey (4) || 14,712 || 36–81
|- align="center" bgcolor="bbffbb"
|118 || August 13 ||  @ Athletics || 4–2 || Edge (1–0) || Norris (3–5) || Buskey (5) || 3,183 || 37–81
|- align="center" bgcolor="bbffbb"
|119 || August 14 ||  @ Athletics || 6–2 || Huffman (5–13) || Minetto (1–4) || || 1,289 || 38–81
|- align="center" bgcolor="ffbbbb"
|120 || August 15 ||  @ Athletics || 3–1 || Kingman (3–4) || Jefferson (1–10) || Heaverlo (9) || 2,151 || 38–82
|- align="center" bgcolor="bbffbb"
|121 || August 17 ||  @ Angels || 6–5 || Stieb (5–3) || Clear (10–4) || || 25,050 || 39–82
|- align="center" bgcolor="ffbbbb"
|122 || August 18 ||  @ Angels || 7–5 || Ryan (13–8) || Underwood (5–15) || Clear (13) || 30,361 || 39–83
|- align="center" bgcolor="ffbbbb"
|123 || August 19 ||  @ Angels || 4–2 || Aase (9–8) || Moore (3–4) || || 23,814 || 39–84
|- align="center" bgcolor="ffbbbb"
|124 || August 20 ||  @ Mariners || 7–4 || Parrott (11–8) || Edge (1–1) || || 5,642 || 39–85
|- align="center" bgcolor="ffbbbb"
|125 || August 21 ||  @ Mariners || 8–4 || Montague (6–4) || Huffman (5–14) || McLaughlin (11) || 8,376 || 39–86
|- align="center" bgcolor="ffbbbb"
|126 || August 22 ||  @ Mariners || 6–3 || Honeycutt (9–9) || Stieb (5–4) || || 7,365 || 39–87
|- align="center" bgcolor="bbffbb"
|127 || August 24 ||  Angels || 6–4 || Underwood (6–15) || Knapp (3–3) || Buskey (6) || 18,077 || 40–87
|- align="center" bgcolor="ffbbbb"
|128 || August 25 ||  Angels || 24–2 || Frost (13–8) || Moore (3–5) || || 25,207 || 40–88
|- align="center" bgcolor="bbffbb"
|129 || August 26 ||  Angels || 9–3 || Edge (2–1) || Ryan (13–10) || || 22,619 || 41–88
|- align="center" bgcolor="bbffbb"
|130 || August 27 ||  Athletics || 7–0 || Huffman (6–14) || McCatty (8–9) || || 12,047 || 42–88
|- align="center" bgcolor="ffbbbb"
|131 || August 28 ||  Athletics || 6–3 || Langford (10–13) || Stieb (5–5) || || 21,736 || 42–89
|- align="center" bgcolor="ffbbbb"
|132 || August 29 ||  Athletics || 6–4 || Norris (5–6) || Underwood (6–16) || || 13,071 || 42–90
|- align="center" bgcolor="ffbbbb"
|133 || August 30 ||  Mariners || 8–2 || Parrott (13–8) || Moore (3–6) || || 11,850 || 42–91
|- align="center" bgcolor="bbffbb"
|134 || August 31 ||  Mariners || 5–4 (11) || Buskey (6–5) || McLaughlin (6–5) || || 11,254 || 43–91
|-

|- align="center" bgcolor="ffbbbb"
|135 || September 1 ||  Mariners || 3–2 (10) || Honeycutt (10–9) || Buskey (6–6) || || 23,139 || 43–92
|- align="center" bgcolor="bbffbb"
|136 || September 2 ||  Mariners || 8–5 || Stieb (6–5) || Twitchell (0–2) || Jefferson (1) || 14,776 || 44–92
|- align="center" bgcolor="ffbbbb"
|137 || September 3 ||  @ Orioles || 2–1 (11) || Martinez (9–2) || Buskey (6–7) || || || 44–93
|- align="center" bgcolor="ffbbbb"
|138 || September 3 ||  @ Orioles || 5–1 || Flanagan (20–7) || Lemanczyk (8–10) || || 20,432 || 44–94
|- align="center" bgcolor="bbbbbb"
| – || September 5 || @ Orioles || colspan=6|Postponed (rain) Rescheduled for September 6
|- align="center" bgcolor="ffbbbb"
|139 || September 6 ||  @ Orioles || 5–0 || Martínez (15–12) || Edge (2–2) || || 7,053 || 44–95
|- align="center" bgcolor="ffbbbb"
|140 || September 7 ||  @ Indians || 9–8 || Reuschel (2–1) || Buskey (6–8) || || 4,222 || 44–96
|- align="center" bgcolor="ffbbbb"
|141 || September 8 ||  @ Indians || 5–4 || Wise (15–7) || Stieb (6–6) || || 4,439 || 44–97
|- align="center" bgcolor="ffbbbb"
|142 || September 9 ||  @ Indians || 14–10 || Monge (9–9) || Buskey (6–9) || || 9,166 || 44–98
|- align="center" bgcolor="bbffbb"
|143 || September 11 ||  Orioles || 3–1 || Underwood (7–16) || McGregor (11–5) || || 12,092 || 45–98
|- align="center" bgcolor="bbffbb"
|144 || September 12 ||  Orioles || 3–2 || Edge (3–2) || Palmer (8–6) || || 21,213 || 46–98
|- align="center" bgcolor="ffbbbb"
|145 || September 13 ||  Orioles || 10–4 || Flanagan (22–7) || Huffman (6–15) || || 11,080 || 46–99
|- align="center" bgcolor="bbffbb"
|146 || September 14 ||  Indians || 4–3 || Stieb (7–6) || Wise (15–8) || || 11,010 || 47–99
|- align="center" bgcolor="bbffbb"
|147 || September 15 ||  Indians || 5–2 || Moore (4–6) || Barker (6–5) || || 12,160 || 48–99
|- align="center" bgcolor="bbffbb"
|148 || September 16 ||  Indians || 8–2 || Underwood (8–16) || Garland (4–10) || || 17,078 || 49–99
|- align="center" bgcolor="bbffbb"
|149 || September 17 ||  Red Sox || 5–4 || Jefferson (2–10) || Drago (9–6) || || || 50–99
|- align="center" bgcolor="ffbbbb"
|150 || September 17 ||  Red Sox || 5–3 || Rainey (7–5) || Freisleben (2–3) || Campbell (9) || 15,644 || 50–100
|- align="center" bgcolor="ffbbbb"
|151 || September 18 ||  Red Sox || 8–3 || Torrez (15–12) || Huffman (6–16) || || 13,208 || 50–101
|- align="center" bgcolor="ffbbbb"
|152 || September 19 ||  Red Sox || 8–0 || Stanley (16–10) || Stieb (7–7) || || 21,650 || 50–102
|- align="center" bgcolor="bbffbb"
|153 || September 20 ||  Red Sox || 6–2 || Moore (5–6) || Renko (10–9) || || 13,201 || 51–102
|- align="center" bgcolor="bbffbb"
|154 || September 21 ||  Yankees || 3–2 || Underwood (9–16) || Guidry (17–8) || Buskey (7) || 22,331 || 52–102
|- align="center" bgcolor="ffbbbb"
|155 || September 22 ||  Yankees || 7–4 || Tiant (12–8) || Edge (3–3) || Gossage (16) || 37,408 || 52–103
|- align="center" bgcolor="ffbbbb"
|156 || September 23 ||  Yankees || 7–5 || John (20–9) || Huffman (6–17) || Gossage (17) || 28,137 || 52–104
|- align="center" bgcolor="bbffbb"
|157 || September 25 ||  @ Red Sox || 5–3 || Stieb (8–7) || Stanley (16–11) || || 18,929 || 53–104
|- align="center" bgcolor="ffbbbb"
|158 || September 26 ||  @ Red Sox || 6–4 || Rainey (8–5) || Moore (5–7) || Drago (12) || 18,010 || 53–105
|- align="center" bgcolor="ffbbbb"
|159 || September 27 ||  @ Red Sox || 6–5 || Drago (10–6) || Buskey (6–10) || || 20,853 || 53–106
|- align="center" bgcolor="ffbbbb"
|160 || September 28 ||  @ Yankees || 7–3 || Tiant (13–8) || Edge (3–4) || || 17,647 || 53–107
|- align="center" bgcolor="ffbbbb"
|161 || September 29 ||  @ Yankees || 9–4 || John (21–9) || Huffman (6–18) || || 30,016 || 53–108
|- align="center" bgcolor="ffbbbb"
|162 || September 30 ||  @ Yankees || 9–2 || Davis (14–2) || Stieb (8–8) || Griffin (1) || 28,150 || 53–109
|-

Player stats

Batting

Starters by position
Note: Pos = Position; G = Games played; AB = At bats; R = Runs scored; H = Hits; 2B = Doubles; 3B = Triples; Avg. = Batting average; HR = Home runs; RBI = Runs batted in; SB = Stolen bases

Other batters
Note: G = Games played; AB = At bats; R = Runs scored; H = Hits; 2B = Doubles; 3B = Triples; Avg. = Batting average; HR = Home runs; RBI = Runs batted in; SB = Stolen bases

Pitching

Starting pitchers
Note: G = Games pitched; GS = Games started; IP = Innings pitched; W = Wins; L = Losses; ERA = Earned run average; R = Runs allowed; ER = Earned runs allowed; BB = Walks allowed; K = Strikeouts

Other pitchers
Note: G = Games pitched; GS = Games started; IP = Innings pitched; W = Wins; L = Losses; SV = Saves; ERA = Earned run average; R = Runs allowed; ER = Earned runs allowed; BB = Walks allowed; K = Strikeouts

Relief pitchers
Note: G = Games pitched; IP = Innings pitched; W = Wins; L = Losses; SV = Saves; ERA = Earned run average; R = Runs allowed; ER = Earned runs allowed; BB = Walks allowed; K = Strikeouts

Awards and honors
Alfredo Griffin, American League Rookie of the Year Award
 Alfredo Griffin, Player of the Month Award, September

All-Star Game
Dave Lemanczyk, reserve

Farm system

Notes

References

External links
1979 Toronto Blue Jays at Baseball Reference
1979 Toronto Blue Jays at Baseball Almanac

Toronto Blue Jays seasons
Toronto Blue Jays season
1979 in Canadian sports
1979 in Toronto